In mathematics, Young's convolution inequality is a mathematical inequality about the convolution of two functions, named after William Henry Young.

Statement

Euclidean Space

In real analysis, the following result is called Young's convolution inequality:

with  Then

Here the star denotes convolution,  is Lebesgue space, and

denotes the usual  norm.

Equivalently, if  and  then

Generalizations

we have a bound 

Equivalently, if  and  then 

Since  is in fact a locally compact abelian group (and therefore unimodular) with the Lebesgue measure the desired Haar measure, this is in fact a generalization.

This generalization may be refined. Let  and  be as before and assume  satisfy  Then there exists a constant  such that for any  and any measurable function  on  that belongs to the weak  space  which by definition means that the following supremum

is finite, we have  and

Applications

An example application is that Young's inequality can be used to show that the heat semigroup is a contracting semigroup using the  norm (that is, the Weierstrass transform does not enlarge the  norm).

Proof

Proof by Hölder's inequality

Young's inequality has an elementary proof with the non-optimal constant 1.

We assume that the functions  are nonnegative and integrable, where  is a unimodular group endowed with a bi-invariant Haar measure  We use the fact that  for any measurable 
Since 

By the Hölder inequality for three functions we deduce that 

The conclusion follows then by left-invariance of the Haar measure, the fact that integrals are preserved by inversion of the domain, and by Fubini's theorem.

Proof by interpolation

Young's inequality can also be proved by interpolation; see the article on Riesz–Thorin interpolation for a proof.

Sharp constant

In case  Young's inequality can be strengthened to a sharp form, via

where the constant  

See also

Notes

References

External links

 Young's Inequality for Convolutions at ProofWiki

Inequalities
Lp spaces